Cnemaspis schalleri, also known as Schaller's Sakleshpur dwarf gecko, is a species of diurnal, rock-dwelling, insectivorous gecko endemic to  India. It is distributed in Karnataka.

References

 Cnemaspis schalleri

schalleri
Reptiles of India
Reptiles described in 2021
Taxa named by Ishan Agarwal
Taxa named by Akshay Khandekar